Plasmodium silvaticum is a parasite of the genus Plasmodium subgenus Plasmodium.

Like all Plasmodium species, P. silvaticum has both vertebrate and insect hosts. The vertebrate hosts for this parasite are mammals.

Description 

The parasite was first described by Garnham et al in 1972.

It is a member of the vivax group and closely resembles the other members of this group.

Geographical occurrence 

This species is found in Borneo.

Vectors

Vectors are Anopheles balabacensis, Anopheles maculatus and Anopheles sundaicus.

Clinical features and host pathology 

The parasite has an approximately 48-hour life cycle and gives rise to a tertian fever. The disease itself appears to be mild with little overt pathology.

Its prevalence varies considerably: Wolfe et al found the highest Plasmodium spp. prevalence to be 93.5% (29/31) in captive animals but 11.6% (5/43) in wild orangutans. Despite the apparent lack of pathology, a study of the population genetics of the alpha 2 haemoglobin suggested that this parasite (or others like it) has had a significant selective effect on the orangutan genome.

It can be transmitted both by blood inoculation and by sporozoite inoculation into splenectomized chimpanzees.

References 

silvaticum